The 2009 Concurso Internacional de Tenis – San Sebastián was a professional tennis tournament played on outdoor red clay courts. It was the second edition of the tournament which was part of the 2009 ATP Challenger Tour. It took place in San Sebastián, Spain between 17 and 23 August 2009.

Singles main draw entrants

Seeds

 Rankings are as of August 10, 2009.

Other entrants
The following players received wildcards into the singles main draw:
  Jonathan Eysseric
  Filip Krajinović
  Javier Martí
  Andoni Vivanco-Guzmán

The following players received entry from the qualifying draw:
  Adam Chadaj
  Pedro Clar-Rosselló
  Federico del Bonis
  Javier Genaro-Martínez

Champions

Singles

 Thiemo de Bakker def.  Filip Krajinović, 6–2, 6–3

Doubles

 Jonathan Eysseric /  Romain Jouan def.  Pedro Clar-Rosselló /  Albert Ramos-Viñolas, 7–5, 6–3

External links
Official website (es)
ITF Search 

 
San Sebastian
San Sebastian
Concurso Internacional de Tenis – San Sebastián